Jaxon Evans (born 19 September 1996) is a racing driver from New Zealand who currently competes in the FIA World Endurance Championship.

Career
After several years spent in karting, Evans began his sports car racing career in 2015, competing for McElrea Racing in the then-Porsche GT3 Cup Challenge Australia. In his opening season of competition, Evans finished second in the B Class, before stepping up to the overall championship for 2016. After trading blows with Hamish Hardeman for most of the season, Evans would ultimately fall short of the title after a retirement at Winton established an eventual 19 point gap between the two. 

2017 marked a series of changes for Evans, as he embarked upon a dual full season effort with Jamec Pem Racing in the Australian Endurance Championship and a debut in the Porsche Carrera Cup Australia. Evans and co-driver Tim Miles scored victories in two of the four races that season, including the opener at Phillip Island, but would finish second in the championship. In the Carrera Cup, Evans scored five victories en route to a fifth place points finish. The following season, Evans was crowned series champion, awarding him with the opportunity to compete at the Porsche Junior Programme Shootout at the end of the 2018 calendar year. At the program's conclusion, Evans was announced as the victor, being offered a €225,000 scholarship and a ride in the 2019 Porsche Supercup. Evans signed with Swiss team Fach Auto Tech, tallying two podiums and finishing seventh in the overall standings.

In 2020, competing for BWT Lechner Racing, Evans won the Porsche Carrera Cup France. Just weeks later, he was offered his first drive in the FIA World Endurance Championship with Dempsey-Proton Racing, sharing the #88 with Khaled Al Qubaisi and Marco Holzer. For the 2021 FIA World Endurance Championship season, Evans would compete for the team full-time, partnering with Matt Campbell and Christian Ried in the #77.

The 2023 season saw Evans take on the IMSA SportsCar Championship's Michelin Endurance Cup, driving in the GTD class for the Kelly-Moss with Riley Motorsports operation.

Racing record

Career summary

† As he was a guest driver, Evans was ineligible to score points.

* Season still in progress.

Complete Porsche Supercup results
(key) (Races in bold indicate pole position) (Races in italics indicate fastest lap)

Complete FIA World Endurance Championship results
(key) (Races in bold indicate pole position; races in italics indicate fastest lap)

Complete WeatherTech SportsCar Championship results
(key) (Races in bold indicate pole position; results in italics indicate fastest lap)

Complete 24 Hours of Le Mans results

Complete Bathurst 12 Hour results

Complete Bathurst 1000 results

References

External links
Jaxon Evans  at the Porsche Newsroom
 Driver Database stats
 Profile on Racing Reference

1996 births
Living people
New Zealand racing drivers
Porsche Supercup drivers
FIA World Endurance Championship drivers
European Le Mans Series drivers
24 Hours of Le Mans drivers
ADAC GT Masters drivers
Porsche Motorsports drivers
Walter Lechner Racing drivers
Australian Endurance Championship drivers
Nürburgring 24 Hours drivers

WeatherTech SportsCar Championship drivers
Supercars Championship drivers